Sphyraenodus is an extinct genus of prehistoric bony fish. Includes the species Sphyraenodus multidentatus from Angola.

See also

 Prehistoric fish
 List of prehistoric bony fish genera

References

External links
 Bony fish in the online Sepkoski Database

Prehistoric perciform genera